ESCOM United is a Malawian football club based in Blantyre. The club was relegated from the Malawi Premier Division in 2012–13.

History
ESCOM United was founded in 1992 after a merger between two club from Lilongwe and Blantyre of the same company Electricity Supply Commission.

The Electricians, won their first league title in 2007 with one point difference in the last day of the season after MTL Wanderers, who was leading the table, lost home with Silver Strikers FC and Super Escom has won at Big Bullets FC.

Honours
Super League of Malawi: 
 Winners (2): 2007, 2010–11
 Runner-up (2): 2009–10, 2011–12

Malawi FAM Cup
 Runner-up (1): 2007

Malawi Carlsberg Cup
 Runner-up (2): 2001, 2012

Chibuku Cup
 Runner-up (1): 1999

Press Cup/Castle Cup
 Runner-up (1): 1998

President Cup
 Runner-up (1): 2008–09

Performance in CAF competitions
CAF Champions League:
2007 – withdrew in Preliminary Round

References

External links
Tag archives - Nyasatimes.com

Football clubs in Malawi
Works association football clubs in Malawi